The 2022 World Lacrosse Women's World Championship, the 11th Women's World Championship (previously known as the Women's Lacrosse World Cup), is the preeminent international women's lacrosse tournament. The tournament was held at Towson University in Towson, Maryland, United States.

Originally scheduled for July 2021, the tournament was postponed a year due to the COVID-19 pandemic.

Hosting
The United States was announced as hosts of the tournament in February 2018. Games were hosted at Towson University in Towson, Maryland. Two venues were used—the Tiger Field–Lower Fields Complex, consisting of two separate full fields with lighting and scoreboards used by the university's women's lacrosse and women's soccer programs, and Johnny Unitas Stadium, also used by the women's lacrosse program but more noted as home to the school's football and men's lacrosse programs.

Tournament

Qualified teams
A total of 30 nations qualified for the 2021 Women's Lacrosse World Championship. The top ten nations at the 2017 Women's Lacrosse World Cup automatically qualified while twenty other nations earned their place through participating in the continental qualifiers. China, Chinese Taipei, and Finland participated in the qualifiers but failed to qualify but they were designated as potential participants should a qualified team withdraw from the tournament. Kenya withdrew with China, a participant of the 2017 Women's Lacrosse World Cup unlike the two other teams, named as replacement. Argentina, Jamaica, Norway, Puerto Rico, and Uganda will make their debut in the world championship.

2017 WLWC participants (10)
  (host)
 
 
 
 
 
 
 
 
 

Africa (2)
  
  

Asia-Pacific (2)
 
 
  

Europe (15)
 
 
 
 
 
 
 
 
 
 

Americas (6)

Group stage

Pool A

Pool B

Pool C

</onlyinclude>
Uganda withdrew as they were unable to attend due to visa procurement issues.

Pool D

Pool E

Pool F

Ranking of Third-Placed Teams: Pools B-F

Championship Division

Places 5-8

Consolation Bracket

Places 13-16

Platinum Division

Places 21-24

Platinum Consolation

†Loser of game places 29th

Final ranking

References

External links

Women's Lacrosse World Cup
International lacrosse competitions hosted by the United States
Women's lacrosse in the United States
World Lacrosse Championship
World Lacrosse Championship
World Lacrosse Championship
World Lacrosse Championship
Sports events postponed due to the COVID-19 pandemic
2022 in lacrosse